Reginald Arthur Dare (26 November 1921 – October 1993) was an English first-class cricketer and footballer. Dare was a right-handed batsman who bowled slow left-arm orthodox.

Cricket career
Dare was born at Blandford Forum, Dorset. He made his first-class debut for Hampshire against Oxford University in 1949. Dare represented Hampshire in 109 first-class matches from 1949 to 1954, with his final first-class appearance for the county coming against Essex in the 1954 County Championship.

In his 109 first-class matches for the county Dare scored 1,679 runs at a batting average of 12.25, with three half centuries and a single century score of 109* against Worcestershire in 1952. With the ball Dare took 185 wickets at a bowling average of 35.02, with 5 five wicket hauls and best figures of 6/28 against Oxford University in 1950. In the field Dare took 70 catches for Hampshire.

In 1958 Dare joined Buckinghamshire, making his debut in the Minor Counties Championship against Norfolk. Dare played 20 Minor Counties matches for Buckinghamshire, with his final match for the county coming in 1963 against Oxfordshire.

Football career
A centre forward, Dare played football for both Exeter and Southampton.

Death
Dare died in October 1993 at Bournemouth, Dorset.

References

External links
Reginald Dare at Cricinfo
Reginald Dare at CricketArchive
Matches and detailed statistics for Reginald Dare

1921 births
1993 deaths
People from Blandford Forum
Cricketers from Dorset
Footballers from Dorset
English cricketers
Hampshire cricketers
English footballers
Association football forwards
Exeter City F.C. players
Southampton F.C. players